Miss Grand Belgium is an annual Belgian female beauty pageant based in Lint, Belgium. It was founded in 2021 by the event organizer, CC Productions, which is managed by Nepali businessperson Carolyn Collinda. The contest winners represent Belgium at its parent international platform, Miss Grand International.

Previously, Belgium representatives at the Miss Grand International pageant were appointed by different licensees, but all of them got no placement at the aforementioned international contest.

History
Belgium is one of the countries that has participated in the Miss Grand International contest since its inception in 2013. Nevertheless, most of its representatives have been chosen without organizing a national contest. However, after Carolyn Collinda, the Netherlands-born businessperson, obtained the license in 2021, she subsequently organized the first Miss Grand Belgium contest on September 18, 2021, at AED Studios in the city of Lint. The contest featured eight national finalists, and Tenzin Zomkey, who was born in India's Tibetan refugee camp and is currently residing in Flemish Brabant, was crowned Miss Grand Belgium 2021.

In 2022, the original winner, Alyssa Gilliaert, resigned from the title due to health problems, which caused the organizer to appoint one of the national finalists, Chiara Vanderveeren, to compete at the Miss Grand International 2022 in Indonesia instead.

Editions
The following is a list of Miss Grand Belgium edition detail, since its inception in 2021.

National finalists
The following list is the national finalists of the Miss Grand Belgium pageant, as well as the competition results.

Color keys
 Declared as the winner
 Ended as a runner-up
 Ended as a semifinalist
 Ended as a quaterfinalist
 Did not participate
 Withdraw during the competition

2022 : National Finalists

International competition
The following is a list of Belgium representatives at Miss Grand International contest.

Gallery

References

External links

 

Belgium
Beauty pageants in Belgium
Recurring events established in 2021
2021 establishments in Belgium
Belgian awards